George Edward Mudie (born 6 February 1945) is a Labour Party politician in the United Kingdom who was the Member of Parliament (MP) for Leeds East from 1992 to 2015.

Early life
Born in Dundee, Scotland's fourth-largest city, George Mudie was educated at the Waid Academy in Anstruther and later studied Social Studies at Newbattle Abbey College in Dalkeith. He worked initially as an engineer and then joined the merchant navy. In 1968 he became a trade union official with the National Union of Public Employees, a position he held until his election to the House of Commons in 1992.

Parliamentary career
Mudie was elected as a Leeds City Councilor in 1971 at the age of 26 and became the Council Leader from 1980 to 1989, elected as the authority's youngest leader to date at the age of 35 following the 1980 council election.

He was then elected as the Labour MP for Leeds East at the 1992 General Election following the retirement of the former Chancellor of the Exchequer, Denis Healey. He held the seat comfortably until his retirement in 2015.

In Parliament he was appointed as an Opposition Whip in 1994, a position he held until the Labour landslide at the 1997 election when he was elevated to become the Treasurer of HM Household and Deputy Chief Whip. In 1998 he was appointed as a Parliamentary Under-Secretary of State at the Department for Education and Employment. He was dropped from the government in 1999.

He has served on a number of select committees, and has been a member of the Treasury Select Committee since 2001.

He voted in opposition to changes to Marriage legislation, rebelling against his party in a series of "Same Sex Marriages" votes in 2013–14.

Personal life
He is married with three children, one from a former marriage. He named his eldest son Keir after Keir Hardie. His wife is a primary school headmistress.

References

External links 
 Guardian Unlimited Politics - Ask Aristotle: George Mudie MP
 TheyWorkForYou.com - George Mudie MP
 
 BBC Politics 

1945 births
Living people
Labour Party (UK) MPs for English constituencies
Politicians from Dundee
People associated with Fife
UK MPs 1992–1997
UK MPs 1997–2001
UK MPs 2001–2005
UK MPs 2005–2010
UK MPs 2010–2015
Treasurers of the Household
Councillors in Leeds
People educated at Waid Academy
People from Dundee